Kamaua (Kumawa, Kumaua) is a village in Morobe Province, Papua New Guinea where conflict took place during World War II.

Populated places in Morobe Province